The Oaxaca hummingbird or blue-capped hummingbird (Eupherusa cyanophrys) is a Endangered species of hummingbird in the "emeralds", tribe Trochilini of subfamily Trochilinae. It is endemic to the Mexican state of Oaxaca.

Taxonomy and systematics

The Oaxaca hummingbird is monotypic. At times some authors have treated it as a subspecies of the white-tailed hummingbird (E. poliocerca) and others have treated both of them as subspecies of the stripe-tailed hummingbird (E. eximia).

Description

Both sexes have a straight black bill. Males have a violet-blue forehead, turquoise crown, and emerald green upperparts. Rufous secondaries show as a patch on the folded wing. Their central pair of tail feathers are green and the other four pairs whitish. Their underparts are glittering green with white undertail coverts. Females have green upperparts with a similar wing "patch" as the male's. Their central tail feathers are green and the others white with some dusky green. Their underparts are pale gray.

Distribution and habitat

The Oaxaca hummingbird is found only on the Pacific slope of the Sierra Madre del Sur (also called Sierra de Miahuatlán) in southern Oaxaca. It inhabits the edges and interior of humid montane, semi-deciduous, and pine-oak forest.

Behavior

Movement

The Oaxaca hummingbird's movements are not well known, but it might make seasonal elevational changes.

Feeding

The Oaxaca hummingbird forages for nectar at all levels of the forest from the understory to the canopy. Its diet has not been described in detail but it is known to feed at flowers of Inga, Lobelia, Malvaviscus, and Psittacanthus and some others. It is also assumed to feed on small arthropods like other hummingbirds.

Breeding

Little is known about the Oaxaca hummingbird's breeding phenology. Active nests have been found in May, October, and November. The clutch size is two eggs; the incubation length and time to fledging are not known.

Vocalization

The Oaxaca hummingbird's song is "a high, rapid, warbling" described as similar to that of the white-tailed hummingbird but "jerkier, less hurried". Its calls are not well known but also appear similar to the white-tailed's "liquid to slightly buzzy, rolled chip".

Status

The IUCN originally assessed the Oaxaca hummingbird as Threatened but since 1994 has rated it Endangered. It has a very small range and its estimated population of 600 to 1700 mature individuals is believed to be decreasing. A large part of the forest in its range has been destroyed and much of the rest is being cleared for agriculture. It is, however, considered fairly common to common where its habitat remains undisturbed.

References

External links
BirdLife Species Factsheet.

Eupherusa
Birds of Mexico
Endemic birds of Mexico
Birds described in 1964
Taxonomy articles created by Polbot
Birds of the Sierra Madre del Sur